Mahmood Al Zarooni (born October 16, 1975) is an Emirati horse-racing trainer at the Godolphin horse-racing operation along with Saeed bin Suroor. He was born in Dubai, and became trainer on 24 March 2010, before the Dubai World Cup meeting. His first winner was Calming Influence, who won the Godolphin Mile.

On 22 April 2013, the British Horseracing Authority disclosed that 11 horses trained by Mahmood al-Zarooni tested positive for anabolic steroids. He admitted being in breach of the rules of racing. All 11 horses were banned from racing and Mahmood al-Zarooni faced disciplinary charges.  On 25 April 2013, he was banned from racing for eight years.

In June 2021, Al Zarooni announced his return to racing.  His racing licence was returned by the Emirates Racing Authority and he is now based at the Sharjah Equestrian Club.  His first runner since the ban was Major Cinnamon at Meydan Racecourse on November 4, finishing 12th.

Major wins 

 United Arab Emirates
 Dubai Sheema Classic – (1) – Rewilding (2011)
 Dubai World Cup – (1) – Monterosso (2012)

 Great Britain
 St. Leger – (1) – Encke (2012)

 Germany
 Deutsches Derby – (1) – Buzzword (2010)

References

External links 
 

1975 births
Living people
Emirati horse trainers